The 1968 Australian Drivers' Championship was a CAMS-sanctioned national motor racing title open to racing cars complying with the Australian National Formula or the Australian 1½ Litre Formula. The title was contested over a six-race series, with the winner awarded the 1968 CAMS Gold Star.

The championship was won by Kevin Bartlett driving a Brabham BT23D-Alfa Romeo. Bartlett won three of the six races to finish ten points ahead of Phil West (Brabham BT23A-Repco). Third was Glyn Scott (Bowin P3-Cosworth). In addition to Bartlett's wins, single-race victories were taken by West, Scott and Leo Geoghegan (Lotus 39-Repco).

Race schedule
The championship was contested over a six race series with each race also incorporating a round of the 1968 Australian 1½ Litre Championship.

Points system
Championship points were awarded on a 9-6-4-3-2-1 basis to the first six eligible placegetters in each race. Only holders of a valid CAMS Competition License were eligible to score points and only the best five race results could be retained by each driver.

Championship results

References

Australian Drivers' Championship
Drivers' Championship